Atherimorpha is a genus of snipe fly of the family Rhagionidae.

Species
Atherimorpha agathae Paramonov, 1962
Atherimorpha albipennis Bezzi, 1926
Atherimorpha albohirta Malloch, 1932
Atherimorpha alisae Paramonov, 1962
Atherimorpha angustifrons Nagatomi & Nagatomi, 1990
Atherimorpha atrifemur Malloch, 1932
Atherimorpha bevisi Stuckenberg, 1956
Atherimorpha claripennis (Philippi, 1865)
Atherimorpha commoni Paramonov, 1962
Atherimorpha corpulenta Paramonov, 1962
Atherimorpha crassitibia Nagatomi & Nagatomi, 1990
Atherimorpha edgari Paramonov, 1962
Atherimorpha edwardsi Malloch, 1932
Atherimorpha festuca Jell & Duncan, 1986
Atherimorpha flavicorpus Nagatomi & Nagatomi, 1990
Atherimorpha flavofasciata Paramonov, 1962
Atherimorpha flavolateralis Malloch, 1932
Atherimorpha fulva Hardy, 1920
Atherimorpha fusca Malloch, 1932
Atherimorpha fuscicoxa Malloch, 1932
Atherimorpha gracilipennis Nagatomi & Nagatomi, 1990
Atherimorpha grisea (Philippi, 1865)
Atherimorpha hirtula (Bigot, 1887)
Atherimorpha imitans Malloch, 1932
Atherimorpha infuscata Paramonov, 1962
Atherimorpha irwini Nagatomi & Nagatomi, 1990
Atherimorpha lamasi Santos, 2005
Atherimorpha latipennis Stuckenberg, 1956
Atherimorpha longicornu Nagatomi & Nagatomi, 1990
Atherimorpha mcalpinei Paramonov, 1962
Atherimorpha mensaemontis Stuckenberg, 1961
Atherimorpha montana Hardy, 1927
Atherimorpha nemoralis (Philippi, 1865)
Atherimorpha norrisi Paramonov, 1962
Atherimorpha occidens Hardy, 1927
Atherimorpha ornata Nagatomi & Nagatomi, 1990
Atherimorpha praefica (Philippi, 1865)
Atherimorpha pusilla Paramonov, 1962
Atherimorpha rieki Paramonov, 1962
Atherimorpha scutellaris Malloch, 1932
Atherimorpha setosiradiata (Lindner, 1925)
Atherimorpha stuckenbergi Nagatomi & Nagatomi, 1990
Atherimorpha tonnoiri Paramonov, 1962
Atherimorpha triangularis Malloch, 1932
Atherimorpha uptoni Paramonov, 1962
Atherimorpha vernalis White, 1914
Atherimorpha victoriana Paramonov, 1962
Atherimorpha villosissima Paramonov, 1962

References

Rhagionidae
Diptera of Africa
Diptera of Australasia
Diptera of South America
Brachycera genera